The 2014–15 Slovak Cup, also known as Slovnaft Cup for sponsorship reasons, was the 46th edition of the competition.  The winners of the competition will qualify for the Second qualifying round of the 2015–16 UEFA Europa League.

Format
In the 2014–15 season a new format was implemented.

Teams

First round
The matches took place on 26 and 27 July 2014.

|-

	

	

|}

Second round
The matches took place on 12, 13, 20 & 27 August 2014.

|-

	

	

|}

Third round
The matches took place on 2, 3, 9, 10, 23, 24 September, 1 October and 12 November 2014.

Notes

Fourth round
The matches took place on 8, 14, 15, 21, 22 October and 19 November 2014.

Fifth round
The matches took place on 12, 15, 25 November 2014 and 3 March 2015.

Quarter-finals
The matches took place on 17 and 18 March 2015.

Semi-finals
The first legs were played on 7 and 8 April 2015 and the second legs were played on 21 April 2015.

First legs

Second legs

Final

The final was played on 1 May 2015.

References

External links
 Slovak Cup at Soccerway.com

Slovak Cup seasons
Cup
Slovak Cup
July 2014 sports events in Europe
August 2014 sports events in Europe
September 2014 sports events in Europe
October 2014 sports events in Europe
November 2014 sports events in Europe
March 2015 sports events in Europe
April 2015 sports events in Europe
May 2015 sports events in Europe